Robert Charles Dudley (1826 – 28 April 1909) was a British watercolourist and lithographer.

Life
Dudley was born in 1826 and his father was Charles Stokes Dudley, his grandfather was Irish and his grandmother was the Quaker minister Mary Dudley.

Links 

 Robert Charles Dudley, Sciencemuseum
 Robert Charles Dudley collection at MET
 Robert Charles Dudley at National Portrait Gallery, London
 Robert Dudley: artist, illustrator, and book cover designer
 History of the Atlantic Cable & Undersea Communications. Robert Charles Dudley (1826—1909) by Bill Burns
 Robert Dudley and The Atlantic Telegraph. Simon Cooke, Ph.D

References

  Dudley, Robert (The Getty Vocabularies)

1826 births
1909 deaths
British watercolourists
19th-century British painters